Ersa is a figure in Greek mythology.

Ersa may refer to:

 Ersa, Haute-Corse – a commune of the Haute-Corse department of France, on the island of Corsica
 Ersa (moon) - a small moon of Jupiter
 Ersa GmbH, a subsidiary of Kurtz Holding GmbH & Co. Beteiligungs KG for the manufacturing of equipment for electronic production.

ERSA
 European Regional Science Association (ERSA)  – the European section of the Regional Science Association International
 En Route Supplement Australia (ERSA) – part of the Aeronautical Information Publication (AIP) published by Airservices Australia
 Economics Research South Africa (ERSA)

See also
 Erza (disambiguation)
 Ursa (disambiguation)